The City of Kalgoorlie & Boulder Golden Open, or simply the Golden Open, is a yearly professional squash tournament held in Kalgoorlie, Australia. It is part of the PSA World Tour and WSA World Tour.

Results
These are the results from 2016 onwards:

2016

2017

See also
 PSA World Tour
 WSA World Tour

References

PSA World Tour
WSA World Tour
Squash tournaments in Australia
Women's squash tournaments
2016 establishments in Australia
Recurring sporting events established in 2016